Below are the results for the 2018 World Series of Poker Europe, which took place from October 9-November 2 at King's Casino in Rozvadov, Czech Republic. There were 10 scheduled events, culminating in the €10,350 Main Event.

Key

Results
Source:

Event 1: €550 Colossus
7-Day Event: October 9-15
Number of buy-ins: 2,992
Total Prize Pool: €1,435,412
Number of Payouts: 419
Winning Hand:

Event 2: €1,650 No Limit Hold'em 6-Handed Deepstack
3-Day Event: October 14-16
Number of buy-ins: 221
Total Prize Pool: €318,074
Number of Payouts: 34
Winning Hand:

Event 3: €550 Pot Limit Omaha 8-Handed
4-Day Event: October 15-18
Number of buy-ins: 572
Total Prize Pool: €274,417
Number of Payouts: 82
Winning Hand:

Event 4: €1,100 No Limit Hold'em Turbo Bounty Hunter
1-Day Event: October 17
Number of buy-ins: 387
Total Prize Pool: €371,326
Number of Payouts: 59
Winning Hand:

Event 5: €1,100 Monster Stack
5-Day Event: October 18-22
Number of buy-ins: 666
Total Prize Pool: €639,027
Number of Payouts: 100
Winning Hand:

Event 6: €1,650 Mixed PLO/NLHE
3-Day Event: October 21-23
Number of buy-ins: 241
Total Prize Pool: €343,425
Number of Payouts: 37
Winning Hand:

Event 7: €2,200 Pot Limit Omaha 8-Handed
3-Day Event: October 22-24
Number of buy-ins: 187
Total Prize Pool: €358,853
Number of Payouts: 29
Winning Hand:

Event 8: €25,500 Super High Roller
2-Day Event: October 24-25
Number of buy-ins: 133
Total Prize Pool: €3,158,750
Number of Payouts: 20
Winning Hand:

Event 9: €100,000 King's Super High Roller
3-Day Event: October 26-28
Number of buy-ins: 95
Total Prize Pool: €9,025,000
Number of Payouts: 15
Winning Hand:

Event 10: €10,350 Main Event
7-Day Event: October 27-November 2
Number of buy-ins: 534
Total Prize Pool: €5,073,000
Number of Payouts: 81
Winning Hand:

References

External links
Official website

World Series of Poker Europe
World Series of Poker Europe Results, 2018